The Red Army's 33rd Army was a Soviet field army during the Second World War. It was disbanded by being redesignated HQ Smolensk Military District in 1945.

Initial Operations

It was initially formed in the Moscow Military District in July 1941, consisting of the 1st, 5th, 9th, 17th, and 21st Moscow People's Militia divisions, plus artillery and other support units. Kombrig Dmitry Onuprienko (July — on October, 25th 1941) took command. It conducted defensive operations as a part of the Mozhaisk Defence Line and the Soviet Reserve Front.

It was at Naro-Fominsk under General Lieutenant Mikhail Yefremov in October 1941.

With the arrival of the German 2nd Panzer Army to Kashira and its 4th Panzer Group to the Moskva-Volga Canal, the conditions for the German capture of Moscow were created.  But on December 1, the Germans hit the centre of the Soviet front. Two German divisions with 70 tanks broke through in the 33rd Army's sector in the 222nd Rifle Division's area to the north of Naro-Fominsk. On December 2, in the second half of day in the 110th Rifle Division's sector the Wehrmacht went over to the offensive and attacked in the direction of Mogutovo. At 16:00, the 113th Rifle Division together with a regiment from 43rd Army led a counteroffensive on Klotovo and Kamenskoe with the task of hitting the rear of the German grouping to facilitate situation of 110th Rifle Division. As a result of this counterstroke, the opponent was routed. The Soviets captured 47 tanks and about 50 guns. From the west at Naro Fominsk Germans have directed on Kubinka along a highway, and then to Golitcin and Aprelevka, threatening rears of 33rd and 5th Soviet Armies. At Akulovo village German forces have met with 32nd Rifle Division and artillery fire.  It was the last German attempt to break through to Moscow.

When the 33rd Army was surrounded in 1942 Yefremov committed suicide rather than be captured. Following Yefremov's death General Kirill Meretskov took command in May and June 1942.

Smolensk 1943

At the Battle of Smolensk (1943), after a day of probing, the goal of which was to determine whether German troops would choose to withdraw or not from the first set of trenches, the offensive started on 7 August 1943 at 06:30 am (with a preliminary bombardment starting at 04:40 am) with a breakthrough towards Roslavl. Three armies (apparently under the control of Soviet Western Front) were committed to this offensive: the 5th Army, the 10th Guards Army and the 33rd Army, now under General Vasily Gordov.

However, the attack quickly encountered heavy opposition and stalled. German troops attempted numerous counterattacks from their well-prepared defense positions, supported by tanks, assault guns, and the fire of heavy guns and mortars. As Konstantin Rokossovsky recalls, "we literally had to tear ourselves through German lines, one by one". On the first day, the Soviet troops advanced only 4 kilometers (2.5 mi), with all available troops (including artillery, communications men and engineers) committed to battle.

1944–45

From April 1944 the 33rd Army, under General Lieutenant Vasily Kryuchenkin, participated in Operation Bagration to retake Belarus as part of the 2nd Belorussian Front. During the Mogilyov Offensive it successfully crossed the Dniepr and Pronya rivers, and liberated Shklov on June 27, 1944. During the Minsk Offensive the army, in conjunction with the 50th and 49th Armies, participated in the rout of the surrounded Wehrmacht grouping to the east of Minsk. In the end of July–August the Army participated in the Kaunas Offensive during which it cleared the approaches to East Prussia. On September 10, it was released from VGK reserve, and joined the 1st Belorussian Front on October 19 in preparation for the Warsaw-Poznan Offensive.

On 25 December 1944 the Army consisted of the 16th Rifle Corps (89th "Tamanyan" Rifle Division,
339th Rifle Division, 383rd Rifle Division),38th Rifle Corps (64th Rifle Division, 95th Rifle Division, 323rd Rifle Division), the 62nd Rifle Corps (49th Rifle Division, 222nd Rifle Division, 362nd Rifle Division), the 115th Fortified Region, 5th Artillery Division, and other support formations and units, including the 35th Motor Rifle Brigade, the 64th Anti-Aircraft Division, the 9th Tank Corps, the 244th and 257th Tank Regiments, and the 360 & 361 сап (Self-Propelled Artillery Regiments).

On 1 May 1945 during the Battle of Berlin, the Army, part of the 1st Belorussian Front, consisted of the 16th Rifle Corps (323, 339, 383 RDs), 62nd Rifle Corps (95, 222, 362 RDs), 49th Rifle Division, 115th, 119th Fortified Region, and other support formations and units. After the initial Berlin breakthrough, 33rd Army, alongside other armies of the 1st Belorussian and 1st Ukrainian Fronts helped to rout the surrounded German forces to the east of Berlin. Military operation for 33rd Army concluded on 6 May. The Army HQ was redesignated HQ Smolensk Military District in August 1945.

Commanders
The following officers commanded the army:

Kombrig Dmitry Onuprienko (20 July – 25 October 1941)
 Lieutenant General Mikhail Grigoryevich Yefremov (25 October 1941 — April 1942)
Army General Kirill Meretskov (4 May — 8 June 1942)
Lieutenant General Mikhail Khozin (8 June–18 October 1942)
Lieutenant General Vasily Gordov (promoted to Colonel General 9 September 1943; 18 October 1942–13 March 1944)
Colonel General Ivan Yefimovich Petrov (13 March — 12 April 1944)
Lieutenant General Vasily Kryuchenkin (12 April–9 July 1944)
Lieutenant General Stepan Morozov (9 July–29 September 1944)
Colonel General Vyacheslav Tsvetayev (29 September 1944–after May 1945)

Sources and references

http://samsv.narod.ru/Arm/a33/arm.html
 I.Zhorov In rear of the enemy near Vyazma, ВИЖ, 1965, № 6.

033
Military units and formations established in 1941